Hyblaea castanea is a moth in the family Hyblaeidae described by Tams in 1924.

References

Hyblaeidae